Michael Cavallaro is an Australian Italian footballer who plays as a midfielder for Adelaide Cobras.

References

External links
 sportingpulse.com profile

1987 births
Living people
Australian soccer players
Association football midfielders
Croydon Kings players
FFSA Super League players
FK Beograd (Australia) players